The Tale of Genji is a 1987 animated adaptation of The Tale of Genji, directed by Gisaburō Sugii.

Plot
The movie adapts elements of the first third of The Tale of Genji, depicting the life of Hikaru Genji in the Imperial Court of the Heian period.

Cast
 Morio Kazama as Hikaru Genji
 Miwako Kaji as Lady Rokujō
 Fubuki Jun as Oborozukiyo (朧月夜)
 Hagio Midori as Yugao
 Yokoyama Megumi as Lady Murasaki
 Yazaki Shigeru as Koremitsu
 Nozawa Nachi as Emperor Kiritsubo
 Tokita Fujio as the Priest of Kitayama
 Ohara Reiko as Lady Fujitsubo (藤壺)

Production
The movie was directed by Gisaburō Sugii. The character designer, key animator, and animation director was Yasuhiro Nakura. The movie was a joint production of Asahi Sonorama, the Asahi Broadcasting Corporation, and Kadokawa Daiei Studio. A home video version was released in 2000.

Music
The film’s score, composed by Japanese musician Haruomi Hosono, was ranked the 39th best score of all time by online music publication, Pitchfork.

References

External links
 The Tale of Genji (1987 film) at The Internet Movie Database

1987 anime films
Anime films based on novels
Films directed by Gisaburō Sugii
Group TAC
Works based on The Tale of Genji
Films based on Japanese novels